Wesley Koolhof and Matwé Middelkoop were the defending champions, but Koolhof chose to compete in Los Cabos instead. Middelkoop played alongside Julian Knowle, but lost in the semifinals to Hans Podlipnik-Castillo and Andrei Vasilevski.

Pablo Cuevas and Guillermo Durán won the title, defeating Podlipnik-Castillo and Vasilevski in the final, 6–4, 4–6, [12–10].

Seeds

Draw

References
 Main Draw

Generali Open Kitzbühel - Doubles
2017 Doubles